Nicholas Wootton is an American Emmy Award-winning television writer and producer. He has written for various TV shows, including Chuck, Prison Break, Law & Order, NYPD Blue, Scorpion and The Endgame.

In 1998 he won the Primetime Emmy Award for Outstanding Writing for a Drama Series, for his work in NYPD Blue.

References

External links

American television producers
American television writers
American male television writers
Emmy Award winners
Living people
Place of birth missing (living people)
Year of birth missing (living people)